Oleh Vadymovych Kozishkurt (born 9 September 2003) is a Ukrainian professional footballer who plays as a central midfielder.

References

External links
 Profile on Mariupol official website
 
 

2003 births
Living people
Place of birth missing (living people)
Ukrainian footballers
Association football midfielders
FC Shakhtar Donetsk players
FC Mariupol players
Ukrainian Premier League players